August Philipp, Duke of Schleswig-Holstein-Sonderburg-Beck (11 November 1612 – 6 May 1675) was a Danish-German prince and member of the House of Oldenburg. After acquiring the estate of Beck in Westfalen in 1646, he took the title of Duke of Schleswig-Holstein-Sonderburg-Beck.

Biography
August Philipp was born on 11 November 1612 in Sønderborg on the island of Als in the Duchy of Schleswig, (then a  Danish fief). He was the fifth son of Alexander, Duke of Schleswig-Holstein-Sonderburg and Dorothea of Schwarzburg-Sondershausen.

Duke Alexander died in 1627 in Sønderborg and left his tiny duchy heavily indebted. In his will, he had stipulated that his wife should keep unaltered estate to pay the debt, and that the eldest son, John Christian, should inherit the entire duchy but remain unmarried for the time being. The widowed Duchess Dorothea was in charge of the duchy during the ensuing war years, but was unable to pay off the debt, which, on the contrary, was still growing. As a consequence, she agreed that the brothers concluded an inheritance agreement on 17 December 1633, according to which John Christian inherited the duchy in exchange for paying a significant annual amount to his mother and siblings.

After the inheritance agreement in 1633, August Philipp severed his ties with Denmark and emigrated to Germany at the age of 21, where he made a career as an officer. In 1646 he bought the estate Haus Beck neat the city of Ulenburg, Prince-Bishopric of Minden, from 1648 in the Duchy of Westphalia within the Margraviate of Brandenburg, from his sister Sophie Katharina, which she had received in dowry from her brother John Christian, upon her marriage to Anthony Günther, Count of Oldenburg. Haus Beck was August Philipp's childhood home, and here he lived for the last 29 years of his life, where he called himself Duke of Schleswig-Holstein-Sonderburg-Beck. He died 6 May 1675 at Haus Beck, then Margraviate of Brandenburg, and was succeeded as duke first by his oldest son, August, and later by his second son, Frederick Louis.

Marriages and issue 
August Philipp married three times. In 1645, he married Clara of Oldenburg, daughter of Anthony II, Count of Oldenburg at Delmenhorst. In 1647, he married Sidonie of Oldenburg, another daughter of Anthony II, Count of Oldenburg at Haus Beck. On 12 April 1651, he married Marie Sibylle of Nassau-Saarbrücken, daughter of William Louis, Count of Nassau-Saarbrücken at Haus Beck.

His daughter Sophie Louise married Frederick (1638-1684), son of Otto, Count of Lippe-Brake. His other daughter Dorothea Amalia married Count Philipp Ernest (1659–1753), son of Philip I, Count of Schaumburg-Lippe.

Legacy 
August Philipp founded the ducal line of Schleswig-Holstein-Sonderburg-Beck. His sons and their descendance went into Prussian, Polish and Russian service until his grandson's great-grandson took over Glücksburg Castle and the line changed its name to Schleswig-Holstein-Sonderburg-Glücksburg in 1825. August Philip is thus a male-line ancestor of the British, Danish, Greek and Norwegian royal families.

Ancestors

References

Citations

Bibliography

External links

 Article in Dansk biografisk leksikon (Danish)

1612 births
1675 deaths
Dukes of Schleswig-Holstein-Sonderburg-Beck
House of Schleswig-Holstein-Sonderburg-Beck